Stewarts Creek is a  long 3rd order tributary to Richardson Creek in Union County, North Carolina.

Course
Stewarts Creek rises about 3 miles northwest of Monroe, North Carolina and then flows southeast and curves northeast to join Richardson Creek about 0.25 miles downstream of the Lake Twitty Dam.

Watershed
Stewarts Creek drains  of area, receives about 48.4 in/year of precipitation, has a wetness index of 452.64, and is about 28% forested.

References

Rivers of North Carolina
Rivers of Union County, North Carolina